Noemi Jaffe (born 1962) is a Brazilian writer, teacher and literary critic.

Life

Jaffe was born in 1962 in São Paulo from Serbian Jewish parents and was raised in the Bom Retiro neighborhood. She became a PhD in Brazilian Literature at the University of São Paulo at the end of her teaching career. She had written a thesis on Antonio Cicero's poetry.

Jaffe teaches creative writing at Casa do Saber and Instituto Vera Cruz and collaborates for newspaper Folha de São Paulo as literary critic. Her career turnaround happened in 2005 when she published a book of poetry. The book's reception raised her ambitions and she devoted the majority of her efforts to writing.

Her 2012 book O que os cegos estão sonhando which translates as "What are the Blind Men Dreaming" is based on the diary of her mother. Her mother's parents were murdered in Auschwitz concentration camp and her mother survived to write a diary in Sweden that Noemi and her daughter translated.

Her books have been translated from Portuguese into a dozen languages.

Published works 
 Todas as coisas pequenas (Hedra, 2005) 
 Quando nada está acontecendo (Martins Fontes, 2011)
 A verdadeira história do alfabeto (Companhia das Letras, 2012)
 O que os cegos estão sonhando? (Editora 34, 2012) - In English: What are the Blind Men Dreaming? (Deep Vellum, 2016)
 Írisz: as orquídeas (Companhia das Letras, 2015)
O livro dos começos (Cosac Naify, 2016)
 Não está mais aqui quem falou (Companhia das Letras, 2017)
 O que ela sussurra (Companhia das Letras, 2020) 
Lili- Novela de um luto (Companhia das Letras, 2021)

Non-fiction 
 Folha explica Macunaíma (Publifolha, 2001)
 Do princípio às criaturas (USP–CAPES, 2008)
 Crônica na sala de aula (Itaú cultural - 2003)
 Ver palavras, ler imagens (Global, 2001)

References

External links 
 - Writer's site
 quando nada está acontecendo - Writer's blog
Conversation with Brazilian Author Noemi Jaffe at Library of Congress on May 08, 2017.

1962 births
Living people
Writers from São Paulo
Brazilian Jews
Brazilian women writers
Brazilian literary critics
Women literary critics
University of São Paulo alumni
Brazilian people of Serbian descent